Jason Jeffrey Price (born 12 April 1977 in Pontypridd) is a Welsh footballer. He can play as a right sided midfielder or as a forward

Club career
Price had spells with Swansea City, Brentford (for whom he scored once against Reading), Tranmere Rovers and Hull City.

Doncaster Rovers
He signed for Doncaster Rovers under former Rovers manager David Penney, and soon established himself as a key player under Sean O'Driscoll.

On the return to his home country for the Football League Trophy Final at the Millennium Stadium in Cardiff on 1 April 2007, Price suffered a snapped Achilles tendon ruling him out for nine months. He renewed his contract at Doncaster in June 2008 when his previous deal was due to expire. Despite much talk of him leaving Rovers, Price took up a new one-year deal.

One of Price's most important goals was against Aston Villa in the 2008–09 FA Cup fourth round replay at Villa Park, when he poked in a cross from James Coppinger just before half-time.

He joined Millwall on loan on 26 March 2009 for the remainder of the season, and two days later he scored on his Millwall debut – a 90th-minute winner which earned the Lions a crucial 1–0 victory at Crewe Alexandra.

Price returned to Doncaster at the end of the season but was released from his contract on 7 May.

Millwall
On 7 July 2009 Price signed for Millwall on a one-year deal. He joined Oldham Athletic on a one-month loan deal on 1 February 2010, making seven appearances and scoring once against Swindon Town before returning to Millwall. Two days after his return, Price left the club on loan for a second time, joining Carlisle United until the end of the 2009–10 season. Price managed to score his first goal for the Cumbrians on his debut as Carlisle won the match 2–1 against Colchester.

Carlisle United
On 17 June 2010 Price signed a 1-year deal with Carlisle United. On 13 October 2010 he signed a one-month loan deal with Bradford City. His loan was extended to the start of January 2011, with Price scoring his first goal in his eighth game with the club, in a 1–1 draw with Accrington Stanley. On 28 January 2011 Price signed a one-month loan deal with Walsall who, at the time, were bottom of Football League One. Price made his debut at home the following day in a 6–1 victory over Bristol Rovers, the club's best league result since 1986 (which was a 6–0 victory, also over Bristol Rovers). On 24 March 2011 Price signed a loan deal with Hereford United until the end of the season.

He was released by Carlisle United in May 2011 before signing an initial one-month deal with Barnet in League 2 in August 2011.

Barnet
On 2 August 2011, Price signed for Barnet on a one-month deal. He made his debut in a 1–0 win away to Morecambe and scored on his home debut in a 3–1 defeat against Port Vale.

Morecambe
On 3 September 2011, Price signed for Morecambe on a four-month deal. He made his full debut at home in Morecambe's 6–0 hammering over Crawley Town on 10 September 2011.

Guiseley
Price was released by Morecambe on 15 March 2012 to enable him to join Guiseley for the rest of the season.

Prestatyn Town
In August 2012, Price joined Welsh Premier League side Prestatyn Town and made his debut on the opening day of the season in a 4–2 victory over Afan Lido. Price made a great start to life in the Welsh premier league scoring several goals and winning player of the month for September. Price scored two goals to help Prestatyn win the Welsh cup final in a 3–1 extra time victory over Bangor City.

Later career
In the 2013–14 season, Price had spells with Ossett Town, Selby Town, Shaw Lane Aquaforce and Brighouse Town. In August 2016, Price signed for Almondbury Woolpack of the Huddersfield and District League. On 30 August 2016 he scored two goals in his first game against Flockton FC, in which Woolpack went on to win 7–0. He also assisted four goals in that game.

International career 
Price was capped by WALES u21 level.

Career statistics

Honours 

Swansea City

 Football League Third Division: 1999–00

Hull City

 Football League One second-place promotion: 2004–05
 Football League Third Division second-place promotion: 2003–04

Doncaster Rovers

 Football League One play-offs: 2008
 Football League Trophy: 2006–07

Prestatyn Town

 Welsh Cup: 2012–13

2016 Seniors World Cup Winner with England

References

External links

1977 births
Footballers from Pontypridd
Living people
Association football midfielders
Welsh footballers
Swansea City A.F.C. players
Brentford F.C. players
Tranmere Rovers F.C. players
Hull City A.F.C. players
Doncaster Rovers F.C. players
Millwall F.C. players
Oldham Athletic A.F.C. players
Carlisle United F.C. players
Bradford City A.F.C. players
Walsall F.C. players
Hereford United F.C. players
Barnet F.C. players
Morecambe F.C. players
Guiseley A.F.C. players
Prestatyn Town F.C. players
Ossett Town F.C. players
Selby Town F.C. players
Shaw Lane A.F.C. players
English Football League players
National League (English football) players
Cymru Premier players
Northern Premier League players
Brighouse Town F.C. players
Wales under-21 international footballers
Harrogate Railway Athletic F.C. players